Villar de Sapos is a parish in Allande, a municipality within the province and autonomous community of Asturias, in northern Spain.

The population is 24 (INE 2011). The postal code is 33890.

Villages and hamlets
 Almoño
 Selce
 Villar de Sapos (Viḷḷar de Sapos)

External links
 Allande 

Parishes in Allande